Budislav is a given name. Notable people with the name include:

 Budislav Grga Angjelinović (1886–1946), Croatian politician and lawyer
 Budislav Šoškić (1925–1979), Montenegrin politician
  (born 1938), Croatian jurist

Slavic given names